Ghenadie is a Romanian-language given name that may refer to:

Ghenadie Ciobanu (born 1957), Moldovan politician
Ghenadie Lisoconi (born 1964), Moldovan sport shooter
Ghenadie Moșneaga (born 1985), Moldovan footballer
Ghenadie Ochincă (born 1984), Moldovan footballer
Ghenadie Olexici (born 1978), Moldovan footballer
Ghenadie Orbu (born 1982), Moldovan footballer
Ghenadie Petrescu (1836–1918), Romanian Orthodox bishop
Ghenadie Pușcă (born 1975), Moldovan footballer
Ghenadie Tulbea (born 1979), Moldovan and Monegasque wrestler

Romanian masculine given names